Preston D. Cole (born 1961) is a retired American conservationist and was secretary of the Wisconsin Department of Natural Resources during the first term of Governor Tony Evers (2019–2022). Cole previously served as the Chair of the State Natural Resources Board. He was first appointed to the board by Governor Jim Doyle and was reappointed by Governor Scott Walker.

Biography

Cole previously served as the Commissioner of the City of Milwaukee Department of Neighborhood Services. Prior to that, Cole was the Director of Operations for the City of Milwaukee Department of Public Works. Additionally, he previously served as the Parks Superintendent for the City of St. Louis, as well as a Forester for the Missouri Department of Conservation.

Cole received a Bachelor of Science degree in Forest Management from the University of Missouri and was the first African American to graduate from the degree program. Cole was involved with Future Farmers of America in high school.

References 

Living people
1961 births
State cabinet secretaries of Wisconsin
Place of birth missing (living people)
Wisconsin Democrats
21st-century American politicians
University of Missouri alumni
African-American people in Wisconsin politics
People from St. Louis
21st-century African-American politicians
American conservationists